A war memorial is a monument, or other edifice, to celebrate a war or victory, or to commemorate those who died or were injured in a war.

War Memorial may also refer to:

Memorials

 War Memorial to the Unknown Soldier, Victoria, British Columbia, Canada
 War Memorial of Montreal West, Quebec, Canada
 War Memorial, Portland, on the Isle of Portland, Dorset, England
 War Memorial, Lancaster Cemetery, Lancashire, England
 War Memorial (Poulton-le-Fylde), Lancashire, England
 War Memorial (Thornton-Cleveleys), Lancashire, England
 War Memorial, Stanwick, North Northamptonshire, England
 War Memorial, Mells, in Somerset, England
 War Memorial (Falkland Islands), in Stanley, Falkland Islands
 War memorials (Western Somme), near Abbeville, France
 War Memorial, Chennai, or Victory War Memorial, in Chennai, India
 War Memorial (Floriana), Malta
 War Memorial of Brugherio, Italy
 War Memorial of Musocco, Milan, Italy
 War Memorial of Korea, in Seoul, Korea
 War Memorial of Mid America, Bardstown, Kentucky, United States
 War Memorial (Oregon, Illinois), United States
 War Memorial Arena (Syracuse), New York, United States
 War Memorial of the Royal Monmouthshire Royal Engineers, Wales

Other uses
 War Memorial (album), a 1973 album by Pink Floyd
 War Memorials (Local Authorities' Powers) Act 1923, an Act of Parliament in the United Kingdom

See also
 War Memorial Auditorium (disambiguation)
 War Memorial Building (disambiguation)
 War Memorial Gymnasium (disambiguation)
 War Memorial Park (disambiguation)
 War Memorial Stadium (disambiguation)